The 1926–27 Swiss International Ice Hockey Championship was the 12th edition of the international ice hockey championship in Switzerland. HC Davos won the championship by defeating HC Rosey Gstaad in the final.

First round

Eastern Series 
 EHC St. Moritz - HC Davos 3:3 OT

The re-play of the game was not contested, and was awarded to HC Davos.

HC Davos - EHC St. Moritz 3:0 (Forfeit)

HC Davos qualified for the final.

Western Series 
 HC Rosey Gstaad - HC Château-d'Oex 3:2 OT

HC Rosey Gstaad qualified for the final.

Final 
The final was played in Davos on February 20, 1927.

 HC Davos - HC Rosey Gstaad 2:0

External links 
Swiss Ice Hockey Federation – All-time results

Inter
Swiss International Ice Hockey Championship seasons